Alice Ruiz Scherone or Alice Ruiz Schneronk (born 22 January 1946) is a Brazilian writer, poet, haikuist, advertising professional, songwriter and translator. She has published more than 20 books, with her poems being translated in various languages and published in many countries.

Biography 
Ruiz was born in Curitiba, in 1946. She began writing tales when she was 6 years old and began writing her first verses at age 16. During a long time she had only been published in magazines and newspapers. She published her first book at age 34. She compose songs since she was 26 and released in 2005 her first CD, Paralelas, with Alziraz Espíndola, featuring known Brazilian musicians such as Zélia Duncan and Arnaldo Antunes. In total, Alice has 21 published works, such as books, poems, translations, songs and children's stories.

In 1993, Ruiz has honored by the Japanese Brazilian community with the name of haikuist.

Ruiz was married to the also poet Paulo Leminski, living with him from 1968 to 1988. They had three children: Miguel Ângelo Leminski (1969-1979) - who died at the age of 10, victim of lymphoma -, Aurea Leminski (1971) and Estrela Ruiz Leminski (1981). It was Leminski who incentivized Alice to write haiku.

In the late 1970s, in the publishing house Grafipar, located in Curitiba, the couple scripted erotic comic books, drawn by artists such as Claudio Seto, Júlio Shimamoto, Flávio Colin and Itamar Gonçalves.

In 1989, she was awarded with the Prêmio Jabuti prize for her poetry book Vice-Verso. In 2009 she was once again awarded with the prize, this time for her poetry book Dois em um.

Works

Books 
 Navalhanaliga (1980)
 Paixão Xama Paixão (1983)
 Pelos Pêlos (1984)
 Hai-tropikai (1985)
 Rimagens (1985)
 Nuvem Feliz (1986)
 Vice Versos (1988)
 Desorientais (1996)
 Haikais (1998)
 Poesia Pra Tocar no Rádio (1999)
 Yuuka (2004)
 Dois em Um (2008)
 Conversa de Passarinho (2008)
 Três linhas (2009)
 Boa Companhia (2009)
 Nuvem Felix (2010)
 Jardim de Haijin (2010)
 Proesias (2010)
 Dois Haikais (2011)
 Estação dos bichos (2011)
 Luminares (2012)

Translations 
 Dez Haiku (1981)
 Céu de Outro Lugar (1985)
 Sendas da Sedução (1987)
 Issa (1988)

Prizes

References 

Living people
1946 births
20th-century Brazilian poets
Brazilian women poets
Brazilian translators
People from Curitiba
Portuguese-language writers
Translators to Portuguese